Cochylis virilia is a moth of the family Tortricidae. It is only known from Maine.

The length of the forewings is about 4.5 mm. The ground color of the forewings is cream with a cream basal band with a few pale fuscous scales. The median band is pale fuscous and the subapical band is pale fuscous and extending from the costa to the tornus. The apex is fuscous and the fringe is mixed cream and pale fuscous. The underside is pale fuscous and the fringe concolorous. The hindwings are broad and entirely pale fuscous. The fringe is concolorous. The underside is white with scattered pale brown marks from the middle to the termen.

Etymology
The name refers to the larger size of the male genitalia as compared to its most closely related species Cochylis maiana.

References

External links

Moths described in 2001
Endemic fauna of the United States
virilia